Jet Lag is the fifth album of the Italian progressive rock band Premiata Forneria Marconi, released in 1977 by Asylum Records in the US and Manticore Records in Europe. This album incorporates the use of fretless bass in the sound and has a jazzier feel in comparison to the band's previous efforts. Four of the five tracks with vocals are sung in English. "Cerco la Lingua" ("I Look for the Language") is the only one sung in Italian. The album is also the first one not featuring founding member Mauro Pagani, who left the band the year before to pursue solo projects.

Track listing

Personnel
 Bernardo Lanzetti – lead vocals
 Franco Mussida – electric & acoustic guitar, 12 string guitar, mandocello, vocals
 Flavio Premoli – organ, piano, Mellotron, harpsichord, Minimoog, vocals
 Gregory Bloch – electric & acoustic violin
 Patrick Djivas – bass, fretless bass, vocals
 Franz Di Cioccio – drums, Minimoog, vocals

References

1977 albums
Premiata Forneria Marconi albums